FISCO (Financial Blockchain Shenzhen Consortium) is a non-profit organization dedicated to exploring the use of blockchains for financial applications. It is led by over 20 financial institutions and financial technology companies. It was established on May 31, 2016. As of Dec 29, 2017, around 80 members were in the consortium from financial and Fintech industry. The  FISCO website was launched on Nov 17, 2016.

Governance 
The General Assembly is the Consortium's highest authority. The standing committee, or the Presidium, is accountable to the General Assembly. It leads the Consortium and conducts day-to-day work while the General Assembly is not in session. The Technical Committee is the subsidiary body of the Presidium, and is in charge of technology issues. The Technology Standardization Work Committee is in charge of project approval, drafting standards, standards examination, approval and publication.  The Advisory Committee is in charge of organizing external experts to participate in the research and discussion of technology and standards.

Projects 
FISCO has established research projects in areas including credit, equity, loyalty points system, insurance, commercial bills, cloud service, digital assets, and wealth management issuance and trading. Some projects have launched prototypes. FISCO published its propositions for financial distributed ledger in Nov 2016. For the development of distributed ledgers, the paper proposed five principles: legal compliance, traceability, security, privacy protection and business driven; and seven propositions: value alliance, autonomy and controllability, security and reliability, high efficiency and availability, business feasibility, flexibility, portability and Regtech ready.

Members 
Among the members are:

Shenzhen Fin-Tech Association
WeBank
Shenzhen Securities Communication Co. Ltd (SSCC)
Tencent
 Beyondsoft
Huawei
 Digital China
 Forms Syntront
 Yuexiu FinTech

Product 
FISCO BCOS was implemented on top of BCOS with features customized for the financial industry. In December 2017, it was published as an open source blockchain platform. In 2018, FISCO BCOS was brought into practical use as application for the Reconciliation and Digital Escrow area. FISCO BCOS is based on a customized Ethereum.

History 
In June 2016 FISCO was established. In August 2016 FISCO launched a reconciliation platform utilizing blockchain technology. In December 2017 the FISCO open source working group was formed and FISCO BCOS was launched. In February 2018 FISCO launched a digital escrow application for Guangzhou Arbitration Commission. In March 2018 FISCO reached more than 90 members.

References 

Organizations established in 2016